The War Below is a 2021 British war film directed by J.P. Watts, in his directorial debut, and written by Watts and Thomas Woods. It was released in the United Kingdom on 10 September 2021. The film is also distributed in Germany, France, Greece, Australia, the Middle East, South Korea and Japan.

Plot 
Based on a true story, the film is about a group of British miners (known as "Claykickers" or “Manchester Moles”) recruited during World War I to tunnel underneath no man's land and set bombs below the German front at the Battle of Messines in 1917. 10,000 German soldiers were killed instantly after the detonation of explosives beneath their lines.

Cast 
 Sam Hazeldine as William Hawkin
 Tom Goodman-Hill as Hellfire Jack 
 Kris Hitchen as Harold Stockford
 Elliot James Langridge as George MacDonald
 Sam Clemmett as Charlie MacDonald
 Joseph Steyne as Shorty
 Sonny Ashbourne Serkis as Henry
 Anna Maguire as Jane Hawkin
 Andrew Scarborough as Colonel Fielding
 Douglas Reith as Field Marshall Lord Haig
 Jake Wheeldon as Cpt. Leonard Graves

Release and reviews 
The War Below was released in theaters and digital platforms in the United Kingdom on September 10, 2021. It was released on streaming services in the United States on November 11, 2021.

On review aggregator Rotten Tomatoes, The War Below holds an approval rating of 88% based on 8 reviews. Writing in The Sunday Times, Kevin Maher awarded the film 3 out of 5 stars and stated it is "a fascinating Great War side story and a gritty central turn from Sam Hazeldine..." Writing in The Guardian, Phil Hoad described the film as having "an innately fascinating story, even if the underpinning is of unsound construction in places.”

References

External links 
 
 Official website

2021 action drama films
2021 films
2020s historical films
2020s war films
British action drama films
British epic films
British historical films
British war drama films
Films about armies
Films about the British Armed Forces
Films set in 1917
2020s English-language films
2020s British films